|}

The Prix de la Grotte is a Group 3 flat horse race in France open to three-year-old thoroughbred fillies. It is run over a distance of 1,600 metres (about 1 mile) at Longchamp in April.

History
The event was established in 1889, and it was originally open to colts and fillies aged three or older. Its format varied during the early part of its history.

The modern version of the Prix de la Grotte was introduced in 1952. From this point it was restricted to three-year-old fillies, and was initially contested over 1,600 metres. It was designed to serve as a trial for the Poule d'Essai des Pouliches.

The race's distance was modified several times during the 1960s. It was run over 1,400 metres (1965), 1,300 metres (1966) and 1,500 metres (1967) before reverting to 1,600 metres in 1968.

Several winners of the modern Prix de la Grotte have achieved victory in the Poule d'Essai des Pouliches. The first was Apollonia in 1956, and the most recent was Beauty Parlour in 2012. The most recent Poule d'Essai des Pouliches winner to have taken part in the Prix de la Grotte was Dream And Do, the runner-up in 2020.

Records
Leading jockey since 1952 (7 wins):
 Yves Saint-Martin – La Sega (1962), Felicia (1963), Mirna (1964), Tonnera (1966), Pola Bella (1968), Koblenza (1969), Captive Island (1985)

Leading trainer since 1952 (8 wins):
 André Fabre – Houseproud (1990), Baya (1993), Flagbird (1994), Grey Lilas (2004), Anna Silai (2010), Golden Lilac (2011), Mexican Gold (2015), Tropbeau (2020)

Leading owner since 1952 (5 wins):
 Nelson Bunker Hunt – Gazala (1967), Pampered Miss (1970), Dahlia (1973), Nobiliary (1975), Hartebeest (1977)

Winners since 1980

Earlier winners

 1952: Devinette
 1954: Baghicheh
 1955: Myriade
 1956: Apollonia
 1957: Epine Doree
 1958: Reluisante
 1959: Fiorenza
 1960: Sly Pola
 1961: Mopsy
 1962: La Sega
 1963: Felicia
 1964: Mirna
 1965: Clear River
 1966: Tonnera
 1967: Gazala
 1968: Pola Bella
 1969: Koblenza
 1970: Pampered Miss
 1971: Bold Fascinator
 1972: If
 1973: Dahlia
 1974: Paddy's Princess
 1975: Nobiliary
 1976: Riverqueen
 1977: Hartebeest
 1978: Tayyara
 1979: Nonoalca

See also
 List of French flat horse races

References

 France Galop / Racing Post:

 france-galop.com – A Brief History: Prix de la Grotte.
 galop.courses-france.com – Prix de la Grotte – Palmarès depuis 1980.
 galopp-sieger.de – Prix de la Grotte.
 ifhaonline.org – International Federation of Horseracing Authorities – Prix de la Grotte (2019).
 pedigreequery.com – Prix de la Grotte – Longchamp.

Flat horse races for three-year-old fillies
Longchamp Racecourse
Horse races in France
1889 establishments in France
Recurring sporting events established in 1889